Mikael Henrik Sandklef (born 3 July 1973 in Frillesås near Kungsbacka) is a retired Swedish association football player in the midfielder position.

After playing for local club Åsa IF, he joined Västra Frölunda IF in 1997. He joined IFK Göteborg in 2000, and played six seasons for the club. In 2006, he moved to GAIS, retiring after one season there due to injuries.

Clubs 
 Frillesås FF, Åsa IF
 Västra Frölunda IF (1997–1999)
 IFK Göteborg (2000–2005)
 GAIS (2006)

References

External links
GAIS profile

1973 births
Living people
Swedish footballers
People from Kungsbacka Municipality
Västra Frölunda IF players
IFK Göteborg players
GAIS players
Association football midfielders
Sportspeople from Halland County